Hollender is a surname. Notable people with the surname include:

Marc Hollender (1916–1998), American psychiatrist
Jeffrey Hollender (born 1954), American businessman and writer
Pål Hollender (born 1968), Swedish film director
Tadeusz Hollender (1910–1943), Polish poet, translator and humorist